Angeliki Gremou (born 20 March 1975) is a Greek rower. She competed at the 1996 Summer Olympics and the 2000 Summer Olympics. She also competed in the 1998 World Rowing Championships winning a bronze medal in the lightweight women's quadruple sculls and the 2003 World Rowing Championships also winning a bronze medal in the lightweight women's double sculls alongside Elpida Grigoriadou.

References

External links

1975 births
Living people
Greek female rowers
Olympic rowers of Greece
Rowers at the 1996 Summer Olympics
Rowers at the 2000 Summer Olympics
World Rowing Championships medalists for Greece
Rowers from Ioannina